Toomas Vavilov (born 15 July 1969 in Tallinn) is an Estonian clarinetist and conductor. He is one of the well-known clarinetist of Estonia.

In 1992, he graduated from Estonian Academy of Music and Theatre, specializing on clarinet. 1996–1998, he also studied conducting at Estonian Academy of Music and Theatre.

2004–2006, he was the second conductor of Estonian National Symphony Orchestra. 2006–2008, he was the music director and the head conductor of the orchestra at Vanemuine Theatre.

He is a member of Association of Estonian Professional Musicians.

Awards:
 1990: first prize at the Estonian Woodwind Players Contest
 2001: Annual Prize of the Endowment of Music

References

Living people
1969 births
Estonian musicians
Clarinetists
Estonian conductors (music)